The Statue of Sofia is a monumental sculpture in Sofia, Bulgaria.

The statue, erected in 2000, stands in a spot once occupied by a statue of Lenin.

Sophia was considered too erotic and pagan to be referred to as a saint and the statue is still highly controversial. 8.08 meters (26 feet 6 inches) in height, the copper and bronze statue by the sculptor Georgi Chapkanov, stands on a 16 meters (52 feet 5.9 inches) high pedestal. Adorned with the symbols of power (crown), fame (wreath) and wisdom (owl), the crown is also a reference to the Goddess of Fate, Tyche, inspired by the old emblem of Sofia dating back to 1900.

References

Tourist attractions in Sofia
Monuments and memorials in Bulgaria
Buildings and structures in Sofia
2000 sculptures
Buildings and structures completed in 2000
2000 in Bulgaria